is a Japanese artist and photographer. His work has been exhibited in Tokyo, Philadelphia, New York, Madrid, and Venice.

Biography
Hyakutake graduated from the University of the Arts in 2006 with a Bachelor of Fine Arts in Photography, receiving the Promising Artist Award and Society for Photographic Education Mid-Atlantic Region Scholarship Award. In 2009, Hyakutake obtained a master's degree of Fine Arts from the University of Pennsylvania, where he was awarded a Toby Devan Lewis Fellowship. In 2009 he was a winner of the International Photography Awards Competition for his project Post-Industrialization.

Hyakutake’s work is fueled by historical, economic, and social issues of post-war Japan connected to his own personal experiences and the voices of his generation.

Hyakutake currently lives and works in Japan.

Solo exhibitions
2010	Pathos:Tetsugo Hyakutake, Alan Klotz Gallery, New York, NY
2011	Ephemeral Existence:Tetsugo Hyakutake, Gallery339, Philadelphia, PA

Selected exhibitions
2003: Danica, Yokikai Photo Exhibition, Ginza, Tokyo, Japan
2004: Vanessa, Yokikai Photo Exhibition, Ginza, Tokyo, Japan
2005: Day to Day, Day by Day, Yokikai Photo Exhibition, Ginza, Tokyo, Japan (Received the Award of Distinction)
2006: The University of the Arts Thesis Exhibition, Philadelphia, PA
2007: The University of Pennsylvania MFA First Year Exhibition, Class of 2009, Philadelphia, PA
2008: The AIPAD Photography Show 2008, New York, NY
2008: The University of Pennsylvania, Self-Generated Exhibition, Class of 2009, Philadelphia, PA
2009: Extended Views: Tetsugo Hyakutake + Daniel Lobdell, Gallery339, Philadelphia, PA
2009: Costa Nostra (Our Thing) Show, Alan Klotz Gallery, New York, NY
2009: The University of Pennsylvania “La Jetee” Exhibition, Philadelphia, PA
2009: The University of Pennsylvania MFA Thesis Exhibition, Class of 2009, Philadelphia, PA
2009: The University of Pennsylvania East West South North Exhibition, Philadelphia, PA
2009: PHotoEspaña 2009, Madrid, Spain
2009: The University of Pennsylvania MFA Thesis Exhibition, Class of 2009, New York, NY
2009: 2009 International Photography Awards Best of Show, New York, NY
2010: Open Video Call: Selected Works 2009-2010, Institute of Contemporary Art, Philadelphia, Pa
2010: Imperial Video, Ramis Barquet, New York, NY

Awards

2003: Best of Quarter Award, The Art Institute of Philadelphia, Philadelphia, PA
2005: The Innova fine paper award for inkjet printmaking
2005: Society for Photographic Education, Mid Atlantic Region, Scholarship Award
2005-06: Promising Artist Award, The University of the Arts, Philadelphia, PA
2006: Shades of Paper Award, The Innova fine paper award for inkjet printmaking
2006: Best of Photography, Photographer’s Forum Magazine Annual Spring Photography Contest, Finalist
2009-2010: Fleisher Art Memorial Challenge Artist
2009: Toby Devan Lewis Fellowship
2009: Third place in Architecture (Buildings), International Photography Awards Competition
2009: First place in Architecture (Bridges), International Photography Awards Competition

References

External links

ArtNet
Gallery 339
Alan Klotz Gallery

University of Pennsylvania School of Design alumni
1975 births
Living people
Japanese photographers